José Manuel "Manu" Urcera (San Antonio Oeste, Río Negro Province; July 9, 1991) is an Argentine motor racing driver.

Urcera started his motorsport career in motocross. In 2012 he debuted at TC Mouras with JP Racing and Turismo Nacional (TN) Clase 2. The next year he made his debut at TC Pista and was vice-champion in 2014, which gave him promotion to Turismo Carretera (TC). In 2016 he debuted in Súper TC 2000 with the Fiat Argentina team.

In 2016, Urcera got his first wins in both championships. The next year he qualified for the TC play-offs for first time and went on to the Citroën STC2000 team. In 2018 he debuted in TN Clase 3.

Urcera was the 2019 TN Clase 3 champion with a Honda Civic from the Larrauri Competición team. At the same time, he was TC vice-champion behind Agustín Canapino. In 2020 he again won the Clase 3 title, while in TC he finished third in the championship. It was his last TC season with JP team.

In 2022, Urcera was Turismo Carretera champion competing with Maquin Parts Racing, having won two races. In addition, he competed in the Italian GT Sprint Championship alongside Daniele di Amato in a Scuderia Baldini 27's Ferrari 488 GT3 Evo 2020. They took one win.

He is a member of the Campos Racing Academy. He is in a relationship with model Nicole Neumann.

References

External links 
 
 

1991 births
Living people
Argentine racing drivers
Argentine motorcycle racers
Turismo Carretera drivers
Súper TC 2000 drivers